Harold Andrew Horwood, CM (November 2, 1923 – April 16, 2006) was a Newfoundland and Labrador novelist, non-fiction writer and politician. He was a Member of the Order of Canada.

Early life
The son of Andrew Horwood and Vina Maidment, Horwood was born in St. John's, Newfoundland. He experienced a love of literature from a young age and while still an adolescent had already decided on a literary career. He pursued this goal despite the objections of his parents, with whom he did not get along, drawing more inspiration from the life of his paternal grandfather, John Horwood, a sea captain.

He was educated at Prince of Wales Collegiate and worked at various labouring jobs for a number of years, which eventually led him to become a labour organizer. Around the same time, he and his brother Charlie founded a literary magazine called Protocol. Beginning in 1948 he worked closely with Joey Smallwood in the campaign to bring Newfoundland into Confederation. From 1949 to 1951, he was a member of the Newfoundland House of Assembly, sitting as the member for Labrador for Smallwood's Liberals. After leaving politics he started writing a political column for the Evening Telegram newspaper. Though he supported Smallwood at first, by the mid-1950s he had become one of the premier's harshest critics.

Writing career
His first book, Tomorrow Will be Sunday, was published in 1966. Though it was a novel, Horwood acknowledged its autobiographical elements. The novel White Eskimo (1972), arguably his best-known work, was inspired in part by Esau Gillingham. All told, he wrote more than 20 books, including novels, history, natural history, biography, and autobiography. His contribution to Newfoundland literature does not consist only of the works he produced, but also in the example he provided to young writers at a time when little literature had been produced in the province. However, as his political writing and some of his literature indicates, he did not always hold Newfoundland culture, particularly that of the 'outports' or fishing villages, in high regard.

Other activities
During the 1960s he became an opponent of industrialization and began to interest himself in various 'counter-cultural' concerns. For a year he ran an alternative school in St. John's, known as "Animal Farm".

Among Horwood's other accomplishments were being a founding member and head of the Writers' Union of Canada, and holding the position of writer-in-residence at the University of Western Ontario and University of Waterloo.

Later life
In 1980, he was made a Member of the Order of Canada for his "contributions to Canadian literature".

He lived his last twenty-five years in Annapolis Royal, Nova Scotia. He and his wife Cornelia (Corky), whom he married in 1972, had two children, Andrew and Leah. He died of cancer at the age of 82 in Halifax.

Bibliography
Tomorrow Will Be Sunday - 1966, fiction
The Foxes of Beachy Cove - 1967, named Best Scientific Book of the Year
Newfoundland - 1969
Voices Underground - 1972 (editor)
White Eskimo - 1972, fiction
Beyond the Road: Portraits & Visions of Newfoundlanders - 1976 (with Stephen Taylor, photographer)
The Colonial Dream: 1497/1760 - 1978
Bartlett: The Great Canadian Explorer - 1979, biography
Only the Gods Speak - 1979
Tales of the Labrador Indians - 1981 (editor)
Historic Newfoundland - 1986
Remembering Summer - 1987
Dancing on the Shore - 1987
Bandits and Privateers - 1988
Joey - 1989, biography
The Magic Ground - 1996
Evening Light - 1997
A Walk in Dream Time: Growing Up in Old St. John's - 1997, autobiography
Among the Lions: A Lamb in the Literary Jungle - 2000

See also
 List of University of Waterloo people

References

 O'Flaherty, Patrick, The Rock Observed, University of Toronto Press, 1979.

External links
 Harold Horwood at The Canadian Encyclopedia
 Horwoods Bibliography at the Newfoundland Writers' Guild
 
 

1923 births
2006 deaths
Canadian male novelists
Canadian people of British descent
Members of the Order of Canada
Liberal Party of Newfoundland and Labrador MHAs
People from Annapolis County, Nova Scotia
Politicians from St. John's, Newfoundland and Labrador
Pre-Confederation Newfoundland and Labrador people
Writers from St. John's, Newfoundland and Labrador
Deaths from cancer in Nova Scotia
20th-century Canadian novelists
20th-century Canadian male writers